Bojnice Castle is a medieval castle in Bojnice, Slovakia. It is a Romanesque castle with some original Gothic and Renaissance elements built in the 12th century. Bojnice Castle is one of the most visited castles in Slovakia, receiving hundreds of thousands of visitors every year and also being a popular filming stage for fantasy and fairy-tale movies. It was owned by Hungarian kings and nobleman from the 12th century until the territory became part of Czechoslovakia after the Treaty of Trianon in 1920 and was acquired by a Czech entrepreneur in 1939.

History 
Bojnice Castle was first mentioned in written records in 1113, in a document held at the Zobor Abbey. Originally built as a wooden fort, it was gradually replaced by stone, with the outer walls being shaped according to the uneven rocky terrain. Its first owner was Hungarian nobleman Matthew III Csák, who received it in 1302 from the King Ladislaus V of Hungary. Later, in the 15th century, it was owned by King Matthias Corvinus of Hungary, who gave it to his illegitimate son John Corvinus in 1489. Matthias liked to visit Bojnice and it was here that he worked on his royal decrees. He used to dictate them under a linden tree, which is now known as the "Linden tree of King Matthias". After his death the castle became the property of the Zápolya family (see John Zápolya), a Hungarian noble family. The Thurzós, the richest family in the northern Kingdom of Hungary, acquired the castle in 1528 and undertook its major reconstruction. The former fortress was turned into a Renaissance castle. From 1646 on, the castle's owners were the Pálffys, who continued to rebuild the castle.

Finally, the last famous castle owner from the Pálffy family, Hungarian Count János Ferenc Pálffy (1829-1908), made a complex romantic reconstruction from 1888 to 1910 and created today's imitation of French castles of the Loire valley. He not only had the castle built, but also was the architect and graphic designer. He utilized his artistic taste and love for collecting pieces of art. He was one of the greatest collectors of antiques, tapestries, drawings, paintings and sculptures of his time. After his death and long quarrels, his heirs sold many precious pieces of art from the castle and then, on 25 February 1939, sold the castle, the health spa, and the surrounding land to Czech entrepreneur Jan Antonín Baťa (owner of the shoe company Bata).

After 1945, when Baťa's property was confiscated by the Czechoslovak government, the castle became the seat of several state institutions. On 9 May 1950, a fire broke out in the castle, but it was rebuilt at government expense. After this reconstruction, a museum specializing in the documentation and presentation of the era of architectural neo-styles was opened here. Bojnice Museum is now part of the Slovak National Museum today.

Description 
The castle is renowned for its attractions, including the popular Castle Fairytale, the International Festival of Ghosts and Spirits and the Summer Music Festival. The romantic castle is also a popular location for filming fairy tale movies, such as Fantaghirò. In 2006, the castle attracted about 200,000 visitors. It hosts the single most popular museum in Slovakia and has featured in many movies.

Legends of the Castle 
There are many legends relating to the Bojnice Castle, known mostly to the locals. These include the Legend of a Broken Heart, The Story of Peter Poky and the most famous of them all, The Legend of the Black Lady.

Castle park 

Bojnice Castle is surrounded by the castle park featuring numerous species of trees. The park also contains the Bojnice Zoo, the oldest and one of the most visited zoos in Slovakia. The castle park continues in the form of a forest park in the Strážov Mountains.

Gallery

See also 
 List of castles in Slovakia
 Tourism in Slovakia

References

External links 

Bojnice Castle
Castles.info - Bojnice castle
Virtualtour of Bojnice castle

Castles in Slovakia
Tourist attractions in Trenčín Region
History museums in Slovakia
Gothic architecture in Slovakia
Renaissance architecture in Slovakia
Historic house museums in Europe
14th-century architecture in Slovakia
Gothic Revival architecture in Slovakia
19th-century architecture in Slovakia
Buildings and structures in Trenčín Region